Sólo para maridos ("Only for Husbands") is a 1955 Mexican romantic comedy film directed by Fernando Soler for Cinematografistas Mexicanos Asociados. It is based on a play by Joaquín Abati and Antonio Paso. The film stars Manolo Fábregas, Alicia Caro, Fernando Soler and Sara García.

References

External links
 

1955 films
1950s Spanish-language films
Mexican romantic comedy films
1955 romantic comedy films
Mexican black-and-white films
1950s Mexican films